Phelim McDermott (born 21 August 1963) is an English actor and stage director. He has directed plays and operas in Britain, Germany, Spain, the United States, and Australia. McDermott was a co-founder of the Improbable theatre in 1996.

Career
McDermott was born in Manchester, England. His screen debut was as Jester in the 1991 film Robin Hood, followed by further minor roles in The Baby of Mâcon (1993) and other films. He has appeared on stage, including in 1991 at the Nottingham Playhouse production of Sandi Toksvig's The Pocket Dream, in Shakespeare's A Midsummer Night's Dream, and in a 2017 production of Lost Without Words at the Royal National Theatre. He also appeared in the BBC Radio 4 improvisational show The Masterson Inheritance (1993 to 1995).

He was made an Honorary Doctor of Middlesex University in 2007.

Notable productions
1998: Shockheaded Peter for the West Yorkshire Playhouse, Leeds, and the Lyric Hammersmith, London
2002: A Midsummer Night's Dream by William Shakespeare for Deutsches Schauspielhaus, Hamburg
2007: Satyagraha by Philip Glass for English National Opera (ENO), and in 2008 for the Metropolitan Opera (MET), New York; restaged at the ENO in 2009 and 2013, and in 2011 at the MET
2009: The Addams Family with Bebe Neuwirth and Nathan Lane, Oriental Theatre, Chicago, and in 2010 at the Lunt-Fontanne Theatre, Broadway
2011: The Enchanted Island for the Metropolitan Opera, New York
2013: The Perfect American by Philip Glass for Teatro Real, Madrid, English National Opera, and in 2014 for Opera Queensland and Brisbane Festival
2014: Così fan tutte by Wolfgang Amadeus Mozart for English National Opera
2016: Akhnaten by Philip Glass for English National Opera
2017: Aida by Giuseppe Verdi for English National Opera
2018: Così fan tutte by Mozart, a new production for the Metropolitan Opera
2019: Tao of Glass a new production for the Manchester International Festival
2019: Akhnaten by Philip Glass for the Metropolitan Opera
2022: The Hours by Kevin Puts for the Metropolitan Opera
2022: My Neighbour Totoro by Hayao Miyazaki at the Barbican Centre

References

External links
Profile, Amanda Howard Associates

1963 births
Living people
British opera directors
English male stage actors
English musical theatre directors
English theatre directors
Theatre people from Greater Manchester